The Penny George Institute for Health and Healing is an integrative medicine institute in Minneapolis, United States.

History 
The Institute was founded in 2003 through the support of the George Family Foundation and the Ted and Dr. Roberta Mann Foundation. It is named for Penny George, a cancer patient and a member of the George Family.

See also
 Allina Health

References

External links
 Official site of the Penny George Institute for Health and Healing

Organizations based in Minnesota
Non-profit organizations based in Minnesota
Buildings and structures in Minneapolis
2003 establishments in Minnesota